Agostino Lomellini (Genoa, 1709 - Genoa, 1791) was the 166th Doge of the Republic of Genoa.

Biography 
On September 22, 1760 he was elected by the new Grand Doge of Genoa: the one hundred and twenty-first in biennial succession and the one hundred and sixty-sixth in republican history. His mandate reminds the treatment and subsequent elimination with Spain of some economic restrictions which in the past undermined the Genoese economy and trade. Once the dogato ceased on 10 September 1762, he still served the Genoese state in tasks and assignments, such as being sent to Corsica where, however, his management was below the expectations.

See also 

 Republic of Genoa
 Doge of Genoa

References 

18th-century Doges of Genoa
1709 births
1791 deaths